Francis George Mayer (June 18, 1902 – March 24, 1960) was an American football offensive lineman for one season for the Green Bay Packers of the National Football League (NFL).

References

1902 births
1980 deaths
American football offensive linemen
Green Bay Packers players
Iowa State Cyclones football players
Notre Dame Fighting Irish football players
Players of American football from Minnesota
People from Glencoe, Minnesota